Eurycoma is a small genus of three or four species of flowering plants in the family Simaroubaceae, native to tropical southeastern Asia. They are small evergreen trees with spirally arranged pinnate leaves. The flowers are small, produced in large panicles.

Selected species
Eurycoma apiculata Benn. 
Eurycoma harmandiana Pierre
Eurycoma latifolia Ridl. 
Eurycoma longifolia Jack

References

Sorting Eurycoma names

Simaroubaceae
Sapindales genera